Liyou Libsekal (born 1990) is an Ethiopian poet and writer. Her poems were featured in the 2015 African Poetry Book Fund's New Generation African Poets series. She is winner of the 2014 Brunel University African Poetry Prize.

Biography
Liyou Mesfin Libsekal spent her childhood traveling around East Africa with her family before returning to Ethiopia in 2005.
She later moved to the United States to  attend George Washington University where she obtained a BA in Anthropology in 2012. She returned to Africa, after living a short time in Vietnam.

Liyou's poetry explores themes of home, identity and displacement. Liyou's chapbook, Bearing Heavy Things, is included in the African Poetry Book Fund's New Generation African Poets series.
Her work has been included in Missing Slate Magazine, Badilisha Poetry and Cordite Poetry Review. Libsekal is winner of the 2014 Brunel University African Poetry Prize.

Liyou lives in Addis Ababa in Ethiopia. She writes about Ethiopian culture for the Ethiopian Business Review.

References

1990 births
Living people
Columbian College of Arts and Sciences alumni
Ethiopian women writers
21st-century women writers
Ethiopian women poets